James O'Donnell may refer to:

James O'Donnell (architect) (1774–1830), architect
James O'Donnell (organist) (born 1961), organist of Westminster Abbey
James O'Donnell (politician) (1840–1915), United States Representative from Michigan
James O'Donnell (rugby union) (1860–1942), New Zealand rugby player
Jimmy O'Donnell (James M. O'Donnell, 1872–1946), American sports promoter and founder of the NFL's Cleveland Tigers
James J. O'Donnell, former provost of Georgetown University
James P. O'Donnell (1917–1990), historian
James P. O'Donnell (politician) (1920–1997), Pennsylvania politician